The 1991 Hessian state election was held on 20 January 1991 to elect the members of the Landtag of Hesse. The incumbent coalition government of the Christian Democratic Union (CDU) and Free Democratic Party (FDP) led by Minister-President Walter Wallmann was defeated. The Social Democratic Party (SPD) narrowly became the most popular party, but tied with the CDU in number of seats. The SPD subsequently formed a coalition with The Greens, and SPD leader Hans Eichel became Minister-President.

Parties
The table below lists parties represented in the previous Landtag of Hesse.

Election result

|-
! colspan="2" | Party
! Votes
! %
! +/-
! Seats 
! +/-
! Seats %
|-
| bgcolor=| 
| align=left | Social Democratic Party (SPD)
| align=right| 1,214,909
| align=right| 40.8
| align=right| 0.6
| align=right| 46
| align=right| 2
| align=right| 41.8
|-
| bgcolor=| 
| align=left | Christian Democratic Union (CDU)
| align=right| 1,195,965
| align=right| 40.2
| align=right| 1.9
| align=right| 46
| align=right| 1
| align=right| 41.8
|-
| bgcolor=| 
| align=left | Alliance 90/The Greens (Grüne)
| align=right| 262,161
| align=right| 8.8
| align=right| 0.6
| align=right| 10
| align=right| ±0
| align=right| 9.1
|-
| bgcolor=| 
| align=left | Free Democratic Party (FDP)
| align=right| 220,115
| align=right| 7.4
| align=right| 0.4
| align=right| 8
| align=right| 1
| align=right| 7.3
|-
! colspan=8|
|-
| bgcolor=|
| align=left | The Republicans (REP)
| align=right| 49,320
| align=right| 1.7
| align=right| 1.7
| align=right| 0
| align=right| ±0
| align=right| 0
|-
| bgcolor=|
| align=left | Others
| align=right| 32,402
| align=right| 1.1
| align=right| 
| align=right| 0
| align=right| ±0
| align=right| 0
|-
! align=right colspan=2| Total
! align=right| 2,974,872
! align=right| 100.0
! align=right| 
! align=right| 110
! align=right| ±0
! align=right| 
|-
! align=right colspan=2| Voter turnout
! align=right| 
! align=right| 10.8
! align=right| 9.5
! align=right| 
! align=right| 
! align=right| 
|}

Sources
 Landtagswahlen in Hessen 1946 — 2009 

1991
Hesse
Hessian state election